Saint Thomas More High School is a private, Roman Catholic high school in Milwaukee, Wisconsin.  It is in the Roman Catholic Archdiocese of Milwaukee.

Background
Saint Thomas More High School was established in 1972 by the merger of Don Bosco and Pio Nono High Schools. It was initially named Thomas More High School, but the "Saint" was added to the name in the summer of 2007 to re-emphasize the school's Catholic heritage, at the request of Archbishop Timothy Dolan.

Beginning in 2007, students are equipped with a laptop computer at the start of the school year.

Athletics 
Saint Thomas More High School is a member of the Wisconsin Interscholastic Athletic Association and the Woodland Conference. The school offers the following sports:

Fall: football, boys' cross country, girls' cross country, boys' soccer, girls' volleyball, girls' swimming, girls' tennis, girls' golf, girls' pom pons

Winter: boys' basketball, girls' basketball, boys' bowling, girls' bowling, boys' swimming, girls' pom pons, wrestling

Spring: baseball, boys' track & field, girls' track & field, boys' tennis, boys' golf, girls' soccer, girls' softball

State titles
Thomas More High School has won 18 state titles from 1973 to the present:

1973 boys' cross country
1974 boys' cross country
1974 boys' wrestling
1975 boys' wrestling
1976 football
1976 boys' cross country
1977 football
1978 boys' cross country
1980 boys' cross country
1981 boys' cross country
1981 football
1981 boys' track & field
1981 boys' baseball
1988 boys' basketball
1996 boys' baseball
1999 girls' volleyball
2000 girls' volleyball
2006 Soccer

Conference championships
PN denotes Pio Nono, DB denotes Don Bosco

Boys' soccer (TM: 1998, 1999, 2012)
Wrestling (DB: 1958, 1965, 1969, 1970; PN: 1972; TM: 1974, 1975, 1977, 1978, 1979, 1980, 1981)
Boys' track & field (TM: 1976, 1981)
Boys' golf (PN: 1931; DB: 1962; TM: 1986, 1998, 2001, 2002, 2010, 2011, 2012)
Football (PN: 1927, 1935, 1936; DB: 1953, 1954, 1961, 1964, 1965, 1966, 1967, 1970; TM: 1973, 1974, 1976, 1979, 1980, 1981, 2004)
Boys' cross country (TM: 1973, 1974, 1975, 1976, 1977, 1978, 1979, 1980, 1981, 1982, 1998)
Boys' basketball (PN: 1932, 1937; DB: 1952, 1953, 1955, 1956, 1968, 1970; TM: 1977, 1982, 1987, 1988, 1998, 2001, 2002)
Baseball (PN: 1931; DB: 1954, 1955; TM: 1975, 1980, 1981, 1984, 1987, 1996, 1997, 1999, 2001, 2005, 2009)
Boys' tennis (TM: 2011, 2012)
Girls' volleyball (TM: 1995, 1997, 1998, 1999, 2000, 2001, 2002, 2003, 2004, 2007)
Softball (TM: 1995, 1996)
Girls' basketball (TM: 1998, 2000)
Girls' golf (TM: 2003)
Girls' bowling (TM: 2009)

Thomas More's girls' volleyball team had a winning streak from 1997 to 2005, during which it won 77 conference matches and 8 consecutive conference titles.

The school's mascot is the Cavaliers.

Notable alumni and faculty 

George Lee Andrews, Broadway actor and Guinness World Records holder for most performances in the same Broadway show, The Phantom of the Opera
Dave Cieslewicz, 56th mayor of Madison, Wisconsin
Pedro Colón, first Latino elected to the Wisconsin legislature, now a Wisconsin circuit judge
Anthony Crivello, Tony Award-winning actor in 1993 for Kiss of the Spider Woman
Jonathan Dekker, professional football player
Bob Donovan, Wisconsin state legislator
Jim Haluska, Rose Bowl quarterback and NFL player, coached and taught at Thomas More
Chris Larson, member of the Wisconsin State Senate
Dick Miller, Played for Indiana Pacers and Utah Jazz during 1980–81 season
Jerry Panek, professional soccer player and coach, former coach at St. Thomas More
John R. Plewa, Wisconsin state senator
Edward J. Zore, Former CEO of Northwestern Mutual
T. J. Otzelberger, American basketball coach, currently Head Men’s Basketball Coach at Iowa State University (ISU)
Jim Jodat, former NFL football player with the Rams, Seahawks, and Chargers

References

External links
 School Website
 Football Stats

Roman Catholic Archdiocese of Milwaukee
Educational institutions established in 1890
High schools in Milwaukee
Catholic secondary schools in Wisconsin
1890 establishments in Wisconsin